English National Ballet School is a specialist classical ballet school based in London in the United Kingdom.  The School was founded in 1988 by Peter Schaufuss as the official school of English National Ballet. The School's current Artistic Director is Viviana Durante.

Overview
English National Ballet School is a specialist training centre for young ballet dancers aged 16 to 19. Many graduates become dancers with English National Ballet as well as with other international ballet companies.

History

The School was founded in 1988 by then director Peter Schaufuss of English National Ballet as a feeder school for the company. It began with just 12 students, sharing premises with the company. The School grew rapidly, and in 1995 Diana, Princess of Wales opened its new premises in Chelsea, enabling it to train many more dancers. 

Today the School exists as a separate entity but maintains strong links with its parent company, around a third of whose dancers are graduates of the School. Students perform in ENB's touring productions of My First Ballet as well as in the company's main stage productions and those of other leading UK companies. The School's own performances are widely noted, with Dance Europe describing the Winter 2019 performance as 'a terrific show...both entertaining and thoughtful.'

English National Ballet School has an associate programme, ENBS Juniors, for girls and boys aged 3 and up. In 2020, the School initiated a Graduate Trainee Programme as a response to the global pandemic.

Notable alumni
Ruth Brill, choreographer and first artist with Birmingham Royal Ballet
Constance Devernay, principal dancer with Scottish Ballet
Hope Muir, Artistic Director of National Ballet of Canada, Former Artistic Director of Charlotte Ballet
Nancy Osbaldeston, principal dancer with Royal Ballet of Flanders
Laurretta Summerscales, principal dancer with Bavarian State Ballet
Erina Takahashi, lead principal dancer with English National Ballet

Notable teachers
David Yow
Senri Kou 
Michael Berkin
Juan Eymar
Şebnem Önal

References

English National Ballet
Ballet schools in the United Kingdom
Ballet in London
Educational institutions established in 1988
1988 establishments in England